Chelsea Semple (née  Alley, born 7 November 1992) is a New Zealand rugby union player. She made her debut for the Black Ferns against England in July 2013.

Biography 
Semple was named in the squad to the 2017 Women's Rugby World Cup. She scored a try in the Black Ferns 121–0 trouncing of Hong Kong at the World Cup. She has also represented New Zealand in sevens. Semple was part of the winning team of the 2019 Women's Rugby Super Series.

In 2020 Semple was nominated for the Fiao'o Fa'amausili Medal for the Farah Palmer Cup Player of the Year. She was part of the Chiefs team that played the Blues in the first women's Super Rugby match in 2021. She was then selected for the Black Ferns Autumn International tour of England and France. She featured in the Black Ferns historic 100th test match, England won 43–12. Semple then faced France in her sides 7–29 loss at Castres.

She was named in the Black Ferns squad for the 2022 Pacific Four Series.

Semple was recalled into the team for the August test series against Australia for the Laurie O'Reilly Cup.

References

External links 
 Chelsea Semple at Black Ferns

1992 births
Living people
New Zealand female rugby union players
New Zealand women's international rugby union players